Daniel James Itodo (born 14 December 1996) is a Nigerian international footballer who plays for Plateau United, as a left back.

Career
Born in Makurdi, Itodo has played club football for Celtic, DSS and Plateau United.

He made his international debut for Nigeria in 2018.

Playing style
Itodo is known for his long throws.

References

1996 births
Living people
Nigerian footballers
Nigeria international footballers
DSS F.C. players
Plateau United F.C. players
Nigeria Professional Football League players
People from Benue State
Association football fullbacks